Jacob George Hornberger (born January 1, 1950) is an American attorney, author, and politician who was a Libertarian candidate for president in 2000 and 2020. He is now seeking the 2024 Libertarian nomination for President. He is the founder and president of the Future of Freedom Foundation.

Early life 
Hornberger grew up on a farm on the Rio Grande near Laredo, Texas. He was born to a German-American father and a Mexican-American mother. He received a bachelor's degree in economics from the Virginia Military Institute, and a J.D. degree from the University of Texas School of Law.

Professional career 
Hornberger was an attorney in the state of Texas for twelve years. He was an adjunct professor at the University of Dallas, teaching economics and law.  Hornberger stopped practicing law in 1987 to become the director of programs for the Foundation for Economic Education.  Since then, he has been an advocate for free markets and founded the Future of Freedom Foundation.

Political campaigns

2000 presidential campaign
Hornberger ran for the Libertarian party's nomination for the American presidential elections in 2000, finishing in third place. After losing the nomination, Hornberger was part of the effort by the Libertarian Party of Arizona to drop Harry Browne from their ballot line.

2002 Senate campaign 
Hornberger ran as an independent in the 2002 Virginia U.S. Senate election, against Republican incumbent John Warner and independent Nancy Spannaus. Hornberger received 106,055 votes and 7.1% of the popular vote. Hornberger accused the Libertarian Party of Virginia of preventing him from running for their nomination, to which the Party countered by showcasing that he had spent a considerable amount of time criticizing the LPVA, and had violated the party's rules by asking for signatures to get on the ballot before he was the nominee. It was also reported by The Libertarian Republic that Hornberger withdrew from consideration for the Libertarian nomination and ran as an independent when it became clear he would lose to “None of the Above” for the right to be the Libertarian Party's nominee. Hornberger's performance in the senate election was widely considered extremely disappointing, as he finished not only far behind Warner, but also behind Spannaus, a member of the LaRouche movement.

2020 presidential campaign 
Hornberger began to express an interest in running for the 2020 Libertarian nomination in late March 2019. On November 1, 2019, he declared his candidacy for the Libertarian presidential nomination, expressing a view that the candidates in the race before him were insufficiently committed to abolishing Medicare. Hornberger began his campaign by focusing on the North Carolina primary, declaring his intent to win the vote on March 3. Hornberger was considered an early front runner for the Libertarian Party nomination. Hornberger conceded that him winning the presidency was not "realistic" but hoped his campaign could "make the case for freedom" and "fight for a free society".

Hornberger finished 5th in the New Hampshire primary, which was won by Vermin Supreme. He later won the Iowa caucus. On February 25, 2020, Hornberger won the Libertarian Party Minnesota Caucus with 38.5% of the vote.

On "Super Tuesday" Hornberger received the most votes in all but one of the contests (finishing behind "Uncommited" in North Carolina) solidifying his status as the front-runner. Hornberger has received the endorsement of the Libertarian Party Mises Caucus. Hornberger made a specific effort to win the California primary, organising robocalls to help win the contest.

At the beginning of March, the Libertarian Party of New York announced that Hornberger would be the only candidate to qualify for the ballot. Following this announcement, allegations arose, claiming that Hornberger had rigged the primary. The campaign denied the accusations, stating that "The Hornberger campaign did not file any lawsuits, challenges, or paperwork to keep any other candidate off the New York Libertarian Primary ballot." However, in an analysis by The Libertarian Republic, while there was no concrete evidence Hornberger's campaign rigged the primary, there was substantial evidence that the New York Libertarian Party held a bias towards Hornberger and gave him preferential treatment with regards to information about ballot access.

Upon the entry of Justin Amash into the race for the Libertarian nomination, Hornberger was widely considered to have immediately lost his frontrunner status. Hornberger responded to Amash's entry to the race with an 8-part series on why he considered Amash unsuited to be the Libertarian nominee, and by critiquing Amash's stance on abortion. Upon Amash's exit from the race on May 16, Hornberger was widely seen as regaining his frontrunner status. However, his position was seen as far weaker than it had been before Amash had entered the race, due to hostility from many former Amash supporters towards his candidacy. Hornberger had lost the Libertarian Nebraska primary to Jo Jorgensen on May 12, and in a poll of 305 delegates to the Libertarian national convention taken 3 days before the convention began, Hornberger again lost to Jorgensen. On May 23, 2020, at the 2020 Libertarian National Convention, Hornberger lost the nomination to Jorgensen, coming in second place with 28% of the vote to her 51% of the vote on the fourth ballot. After losing, Hornberger proceeded to endorse Jorgensen for the presidency.

Electoral history

References

External links
 

1950 births
Living people
American educators
American lawyers
American libertarians
Virginia Libertarians
American political commentators
American political writers
Candidates in the 2020 United States presidential election
Writers from Texas
Candidates in the 2000 United States presidential election
American people of Mexican descent
American people of German descent